Cryptoeconomics is an evolving economic paradigm for a cross-disciplinary approach to the study of digital economies and decentralized finance (DeFi) applications. Cryptoeconomics integrates concepts and principles from traditional economics, cryptography, computer science, and game theory disciplines.  Just as traditional economics provides a theoretical foundation for traditional financial (a.k.a., Centralized Finance or CeFi) services, cryptoeconomics provides a theoretical foundation for DeFi services bought and sold via fiat cryptocurrencies, and executed by smart contracts.

Definitions and goals 
The term cryptoeconomics was coined by the Ethereum community during its formative years (2014-2015), but was initially inspired by the application of economic incentives in the original Bitcoin protocol in 2008. Although the phrase is typically attributed to Vitalik Buterin, the earliest public documented usage is a 2015 talk by Vlad Zamfir entitled “What is Cryptoeconomics?” Zamfir's view of cryptoeconomics is relatively broad and academic: “… a formal discipline that studies protocols that govern the production, distribution, and consumption of goods and services in a decentralized digital economy. Cryptoeconomics is a practical science that focuses on the design and characterization of these protocols”. Alternatively, in a 2017 talk, Buterin's view is more narrow and pragmatic: “… a methodology for building systems that try to guarantee certain kinds of information security properties”.

The primary goals of cryptoeconomics are to understand how to fund, design, develop, and facilitate the operations of DeFi systems, and to apply economic incentives and penalties to regulate the distribution of goods and services in emerging digital economies.

Cryptoeconomics may be considered an evolution of digital economics, which in turn evolved from traditional economics (commonly divided into microeconomics and macroeconomics). Consequently, traditional economic concepts regarding production, distribution, and consumption of goods and services also apply to cryptoeconomics. For example, these include Adam Smith's three basic laws of economics:  Law of Supply and Demand, Law of Self Interest, and Law of Competition. They also include more modern economic concepts, such as fiat money theory and Modern Monetary Theory.

History 

The historical roots of cryptoeconomics can be traced to the rise of altcoins, prominent among them the Ethereum project, which in 2015 pioneered the integration of smart contracts into its blockchain, thereby enabling a wide range of DeFi applications.

Subdisciplines 
Similar to how traditional economics is divided into macroeconomics (regional, national, and international economics) and microeconomics (individual and enterprise economics) subdisciplines, cryptoeconomics can be divided into crypto-macreconomics and crypto-microeconomics subdisciplines.

Crypto-macroeconomics 
Crypto-macroeconomics is concerned with the regional, national, and international regulation of cryptocurrencies and DeFi transactions. The Group of Seven governments' interest in cryptocurrencies became evident in August 2014, when the United Kingdom Treasury commissioned a study of cryptocurrencies and their potential role in the UK economy, and issued its final report in January 2021. In June 2021, El Salvador became the first country to accept Bitcoin as legal tender. In August 2021, Cuba followed with a legal resolution to recognize and regulate cryptocurrencies such as Bitcoin. However, in September 2021, the government of China, the single largest market for cryptocurrency, declared all cryptocurrency transactions illegal, completing a crackdown on cryptocurrency that had previously banned the operation of intermediaries and miners within China.

Crypto-microeconomics 
Crypto-microeconomics is concerned with the individual and enterprise usages of cryptocurrencies and DeFi transactions. A strong majority of USA adults have heard about major cryptocurrencies (Bitcoin, Ether), and 16% say they personally have invested in, traded, or otherwise used one. More than 300 million people use cryptocurrency worldwide, and approximately 46 million Americans have invested in Bitcoin.

Criticisms and controversies 

Bitcoin, along with other cryptocurrencies, has been described as an economic bubble by many economists, including Robert Shiller, Joseph Stiglitz, Richard Thaler,  Paul Krugman, and Nouriel Roubini. In addition, Bitcoin and other cryptocurrencies have been criticized for the amount of electricity required for cryptocurrency “mining” (blockchain transaction validation), and for their being used to purchase illegal goods.

See also 

 Tokenomics

References

External links 

 
 MIT Cryptoeconomics Lab
 Wikiversity - Cryptoeconomics

Further reading 
 Chris Berg, Sinclair Davidson, Jason Potts. Understanding the Blockchain Economy: An Introduction to Institutional Cryptoeconomics. Edward Elgar Publishing, 2019.
 Jian Gong, Wei Xu. Cryptoeconomics: Igniting a New Era of Blockchain. CRC Press, 2020.

Cryptocurrencies
Economics
Economic theories